Campbell Clayton-Greene (born 26 March 1967) is a former New Zealand rower. He represented New Zealand at the 1988 Summer Olympics in the coxless four in a team with Geoff Cotter, Bill Coventry, and Neil Gibson, where they came seventh. At the 1989 World Rowing Championships at Bled, Yugoslavia, he won a Bronze in the men's four with Ian Wright, Alastair Mackintosh, and Bill Coventry.

References

1967 births
Living people
New Zealand male rowers
Rowers at the 1988 Summer Olympics
Rowers at the 1992 Summer Olympics
Olympic rowers of New Zealand
World Rowing Championships medalists for New Zealand